Tuttle House may refer to:

in the United States
(by state then city)
Bronson B. Tuttle House, Naugatuck, Connecticut, listed on the NRHP in Connecticut
Bishop Daniel S. Tuttle House, Boise, Idaho, listed on the NRHP in Idaho
Columbus Tuttle House, Lapeer, Michigan, listed on the NRHP in Michigan
Tuttle House, Ipswich, Massachusetts
Donald D. Tuttle House, Concord, New Hampshire, listed on the NRHP
David Tuttle Cooperage, Dover, New Jersey, listed on the NRHP in New Jersey
 Tuttle House (Whippany, New Jersey), listed on the NRHP in New Jersey
Newman Tuttle House, Lacona, New York, listed on the NRHP in New York
 Tuttle House (Fredericktown, Ohio), listed on the NRHP in Ohio
Tuttle-Folsom House, Manti, Utah, listed on the NRHP in Utah
A. G. Tuttle Estate, Baraboo, Wisconsin, listed on the NRHP in Wisconsin